"Five Long Years" is a song written and recorded by blues vocalist and pianist Eddie Boyd in 1952.  Called one of the "few postwar blues standards [that has] retained universal appeal",  Boyd's "Five Long Years" reached number one on the Billboard R&B chart.  Numerous blues and other artists have recorded interpretations of the song.

Original song
"Five Long Years" is a moderate-tempo twelve-bar blues notated in 12/8 time in the key of C. It tells of "the history of the metal worker who, for five years, worked hard in a factory and who gave his check every Friday night to his girlfriend, who nevertheless dumped him".  Backing Boyd on vocal and piano are Ernest Cotton on tenor sax, L. C. McKinley on guitar, Alfred Elkins on bass, and Percy Walker on drums.  "Five Long Years" was revisited by Boyd several times during his career, with additional studio and live recordings.

Recognition and legacy
In 2011, Eddie Boyd's original "Five Long Years" was inducted into the Blues Foundation Hall of Fame, who called it "a true-to-life blues in 1952 that hit home with many a working man".

A variety of artists have recorded "Five Long Years", including Junior Parker, whose version reached number thirteen in the R&B chart in 1959.

References

1952 singles
Blues songs
1959 singles
Junior Parker songs
Ike & Tina Turner songs
1952 songs